Mariupol is a city in the eponymous raion on the Sea of Azov in Donetsk Oblast, Ukraine.

Mariupol may also refer to:

Places
 Mariupol Raion, Donetsk Oblast, Donbas, Ukraine
 Port of Mariupol, Mariupol, Mariupol Raion, Donetsk Oblast, Ukraine
 Mariupol International Airport, Mariupol, Mariupol Raion, Donetsk Oblast, Ukraine
 Mariupol regional intensive care hospital, Mariupol, Mariupol Raion, Donetsk Oblast, Ukraine

Mariupol and war
Battle of Mariupol (1919), between Soviet Ukraine and White Russia
Battle of Mariupol (2014), between Ukraine and the Donetsk People's Republic
Offensive on Mariupol (September 2014), between Donetsk People's Republic and Ukraine
Siege of Mariupol (2022), Russian Federation forces siege and attacks
Mariupol hospital airstrike
Mariupol theatre airstrike

See also
 January 2015 Mariupol rocket attack, artillery barrage by Donetsk People's Republic

Mariupol and language
 Mariupol Greek, a dialect of the Greek language spoken on the north shore of the Sea of Azov

Mariupol and higher education
 Mariupol State University

Mariupol and business
 Mariupol Investment Group

Sports
 FC Mariupol, Mariupol, Donetsk, Ukraine; a soccer team
 MBK Mariupol, Mariupol, Donetsk, Ukraine; a basketball team

Prehistory of Mariupol
 Mariupol culture, a prehistoric civilization in the Mariupol region

See also